Jason DeSantis (born March 9, 1986) is an American professional ice hockey defenseman who was most recently with Esbjerg Energy in Denmark's Metal Ligaen. He previously played with Nottingham Panthers of the British Elite Ice Hockey League and EC VSV of the Austrian Hockey League (EBEL).

Playing career

Prior to turning professional, DeSantis went undrafted playing collegiate hockey at Ohio State University of the Central Collegiate Hockey Association. After a breakout 2011–12 season in the AHL scoring 43 points in 66 games with the St. John's IceCaps, he was signed as a free agent to his first NHL contract on a one-year, two-way deal with the Florida Panthers on June 14, 2012.

Assigned directly to the San Antonio Rampage due to the ongoing lockout, DeSantis appeared in 28 games to start the 2012–13 season with the Rampagage before he was reassigned by the Panthers in an AHL trade to the Hamilton Bulldogs in exchange for Brendon Nash on January 3, 2013. Upon the agreement of a new NHL CBA, the trade was formalized between the Panthers and Montreal Canadiens on January 14, 2013.

On June 17, 2013, after three seasons in the AHL without NHL exposure, DeSantis left to sign a one-year contract with Finnish club, HIFK of the Liiga. After one season with HIFK, DeSantis turned to the Austrian Hockey League agreeing to a two-year deal with EC KAC.

In his two seasons in Klagenfurt, DeSantis in a top pairing role, contributed with 43 points in 84 games before opting to return to North America after three seasons abroad as a free agent. On September 27, 2016, DeSantis opted to continue his playing career in the ECHL, joining the Orlando Solar Bears on a one-year deal. Prior to training camp, DeSantis opted for a release from his contract with the Solar Bears and returned to the EBEL, signing a one-year deal with HC TWK Innsbruck on October 10, 2016.

On 9 August 2019, DeSantis moved to UK EIHL side Nottingham Panthers.

In February 2020, DeSantis moved to Denmark to sign for Esbjerg Energy.

Career statistics

Regular season and playoffs

International

References

External links

1986 births
American men's ice hockey defensemen
HC Bílí Tygři Liberec players
Hamilton Bulldogs (AHL) players
HIFK (ice hockey) players
HC TWK Innsbruck players
Ice hockey players from Michigan
EC KAC players
Living people
EHC Lustenau players
Ohio State Buckeyes men's ice hockey players
People from Oxford, Michigan
Philadelphia Phantoms players
San Antonio Rampage players
St. John's IceCaps players
USA Hockey National Team Development Program players
EC VSV players
Wheeling Nailers players
Nottingham Panthers players
Esbjerg Energy players
Wilkes-Barre/Scranton Penguins players
American expatriate ice hockey players in England
American expatriate ice hockey players in Denmark
American expatriate ice hockey players in Canada
American expatriate ice hockey players in Austria
American expatriate ice hockey players in Finland